Elachista patriodoxa is a moth of the family Elachistidae. It is found in North America in Ontario and New Hampshire.

References

Moths described in 1932
patriodoxa
Moths of North America